The Dapu Inscription is an epigraphy in Dongju Island, Juguang Township, Lienchiang County, Taiwan.

History
The inscription was discovered by the armed forces in 1953.

Architecture
The inscription is made of granite stele. It describes the story of General Sheng Yurong in catching Japanese pirates alive during the Ming Dynasty.

References

Buildings and structures in Lienchiang County
Epigraphy
Tourist attractions in Lienchiang County